Ivan Zgrablić (born 15 March 1991) is a Croatian professional footballer who plays as a defender for Italian Serie D club Sambenedettese.

In the past Zgrablić played only for Croatian football clubs, such as: Karlovac, Istra 1961, Cibalia and NK Opatija.

Career
In January 2020, Zgrablić returned to Cibalia from NK Uljanik.

On 15 October 2021, he signed for Serie D club Sambenedettese.

Honours
Cibalia
Croatian Second Football League: 2015–16

References

External links
 
 Ivan Zgrablić at LPF.ro 

1991 births
Living people
Sportspeople from Pula
Association football central defenders
Croatian footballers
NK Karlovac players
NK Istra 1961 players
HNK Cibalia players
FC Voluntari players
FC Nitra players
NK Opatija players
A.S. Sambenedettese players
Croatian Football League players
First Football League (Croatia) players
Liga I players
Slovak Super Liga players
Serie D players
Croatian expatriate footballers
Croatian expatriate sportspeople in Romania
Expatriate footballers in Romania
Croatian expatriate sportspeople in Slovakia
Expatriate footballers in Slovakia
Croatian expatriate sportspeople in Italy
Expatriate footballers in Italy